An infix is an affix inserted inside a word stem (an existing word or the core of a family of words). It contrasts with adfix, a rare term for an affix attached to the outside of a stem, such as a prefix or suffix.

English 
English has almost no true infixes and those it does have are marginal. Most are heard in colloquial speech; although there are other examples, such as in technical terminology, these examples are often more accurately described as tmesis.

Colloquialisms
None of the following are recognized in standard English.
(education) This exists as a slang phenomenon.
Infixes also occur in some language games.
 The use of 'expletive infixes' such as -fucking- and -bloody-, which are words rather than affixes, is known as tmesis.
 A /ə/ infix can split a word-initial consonant cluster to add emphasis to the word. For example, "I didn't say paint the room red, I said black... [bə'læk]. Capische?", or the most commonly used word being an infixed version of the word "please", "Oh [pə'liz], give me a break".

Indo-European nasal infix

The present tense of some Proto-Indo-European verbs, in the case of a certain number of roots, adds a nasal infix (m, n) to the basic root. The stems of the other tenses have the root without the infix, and thus these verbs are called nasal-presents. This phenomenon is inherited, and preserved to varying degrees, by some early daughter languages such as Sanskrit, Ancient Greek, Latin language, etc.

 Sanskrit exhibits the greatest transparency of this feature amongst the Indo-European languages, with the phenomenon manifesting in three of the ten traditional verb classes, where the infix is higher-grade and accent-bearing in the strong forms, and reduced-grade in the weak forms. For example, 'join' has  's/he joins' ↔ , 'they join'.
 
 Latin present  "I win" (cf. perfect passive participle  "conquered")
 Ancient Greek  (also with  suffix) "I take" (cf. aorist  "I took")

Spanish
In Nicaraguan, Costa Rican, and Honduran Spanish, the Spanish diminutive affix becomes an infix  in names:   →   (cf. standard );  → ;  → .

Arabic
Arabic uses a common infix,   for Form VIII verbs, usually a reflexive of Form I. It is placed after the first consonant of the root; an epenthetic i- prefix is also added, since words cannot begin with a consonant cluster. An example is   "he worked hard", from   "he strove".

Austronesian and Austroasiatic languages
Infixes are common in Austronesian and Austroasiatic languages. For example,  in Tagalog, a grammatical form similar to the active voice is formed by adding the infix  near the beginning of a verb. The most common infix is  used to make an intentional verb, as in '', meaning ‘ruined’ (from ‘’, an adjective meaning ‘worn-out’); '’, meaning ‘stoned’ (from ‘’, ‘stone’); and '’, meaning ‘used’. Tagalog has borrowed the English word graduate as a verb; to say "I graduated" a speaker uses the derived form .

Khmer, an Austroasiatic language, has seven different infixes.  They include the nominalizing infix , which derives  'speed' from  'fast' and   ' trial' from  'to test, to haunt', or the agentive  deriving  'watchman' from  'to watch'. These elements are no longer productive, and occur crystallized in words inherited from Old Khmer. 

All infixes are no longer productive and cannot be used to derive new words.
Examples include:
 The word 'gembung' (variant of 'kembung') means "bloated", while 'gelembung' means "bubble"'.
 The word 'cerlang' means "luminous", while 'cemerlang' means "brilliant"'.
 The word 'gigi' means "tooth", while 'gerigi' means "serration"'.

Seri
In Seri, some verbs form the plural stem with infixation of  after the first vowel of the root; compare the singular stem ic 'plant (verb)' with the plural stem itóoc. Examples: itíc 'did s/he plant it?' and ititóoc 'did they sow it?'.

Similar processes 
Tmesis, the use of a lexical word rather than an affix, is sometimes considered a type of infixation. These are the so-called "expletive infixes", as in abso-bloody-lutely. Since these are not affixes, they are commonly disqualified from being considered infixes.

Sequences of adfixes (prefixes or suffixes) do not result in infixes: an infix must be internal to a word stem. Thus, the word originally, formed by adding the suffix -ly to original, does not turn the suffix -al into an infix. There is simply a sequence of two suffixes, origin-al-ly. In order for -al- to be considered an infix, it would have to have been inserted in the non-existent word *originly. The "infixes" in the tradition of Bantu linguistics are often sequences of prefixes of this type, though there may be debate over specific cases.

The Semitic languages have a form of ablaut (changing the vowels within words, as in English sing, sang, sung, song) that is sometimes called infixation, as the vowels are placed between the consonants of the root. However, this interdigitation of a discontinuous root with a discontinuous affix is more often called transfixation.

An interfix joins a compound word, as in speed-o-meter.

Glossing 

shit, saxophone, picoline

Compare:
origin-al-ly
which contains the suffix -ly added to the word original, which is itself formed by adding the suffix -al to the root origin.

See also 
 Circumfix
 Clitic
 Expletive infixation
 Tree traversal

Notes

References

Bibliography

Further reading
Alexis Amid Neme  and Eric Laporte (2013), Pattern-and-root inflectional morphology: the Arabic broken plural |year=
  Alexis Amid Neme  and Eric Laporte (2015), Do computer scientists deeply understand Arabic morphology? - هل يفهم المهندسون الحاسوبيّون علم الصرف فهماً عميقاً؟, available also in Arabic, Indonesian, French